Posht-e Tang or Posht Tang or Poshtang may refer to:

Posht-e Tang, Bushehr
Posht Tang, Hormozgan
Posht Tang, Kermanshah
Posht Tang, Bijar, Kurdistan Province
Posht Tang-e Cheshmeh Qolijan
Posht Tang-e Dar Vazneh
Posht Tang-e Dustali
Posht Tang-e Kordali
Posht Tang-e Khushab
Posht Tang-e Mishvand
Posht Tang-e Olya
Posht Tang-e Olya, Lorestan
Posht Tang-e Parian
Posht Tang-e Shah Mirza
Posht Tang-e Shayengan
Posht Tang-e Sofla
Posht Tang-e Sofla, Lorestan
Posht Tang-e Sofla Rahim Khan
Posht Tang-e Sofla Seyyed Reza
Posht Tang-e Vosta (disambiguation)
Posht-e Tang-e Chenar
Posht-e Tang-e Firuzabad
Posht-e Tang-e Gol Gol
Poshtang-e Gari
Posht Tang Rural District, in Kermanshah Province